Kevin Conway may refer to:
Kevin Conway (actor) (1942–2020), American actor and film director
Kevin Conway (ice hockey) (born 1963), Canadian ice hockey player
Kevin Conway (racing driver) (born 1979), Sprint Cup and Nationwide Series driver